Winfield S. Braddock (August 23, 1848 – June 1920) was a member of the Wisconsin State Assembly.

Biography
Braddock was born on August 23, 1848 in Philadelphia, Pennsylvania. He attended Yale College before eventually working as a law clerk in Saint Paul, Minnesota. In 1888, he moved to Jackson County, Wisconsin, where he was a cranberry grower. Braddock died in Philadelphia and was buried in Tomah, Wisconsin.

Political career
Braddock was a member of the Assembly during the 1903 and 1905 sessions. Additionally, he was a member of the Jackson County board of supervisors. He was a Republican.

References

Politicians from Philadelphia
Politicians from Saint Paul, Minnesota
People from Jackson County, Wisconsin
Republican Party members of the Wisconsin State Assembly
County supervisors in Wisconsin
Farmers from Wisconsin
Yale College alumni
Law clerks
1848 births
1920 deaths